Germaine van Dievoet (26 September 1899 – 30 October 1990) was a Belgian competitive and olympic swimmer.

Career 
Germaine Van Dievoet was the Belgian champion for the 100m women's freestyle in 1920, 1921, 1922 and 1923. She was one of only ten Belgian women to have participated in the 1920 Summer Olympics, which took place in Antwerp from 20 April until 12 September 1920. She competed in the 100 meter swim, but lost in a semi-final race, finishing fourth. She was the only Belgian to compete in the race. Bronze medal, 100 - meter freestyle at the 1922 Women's Olympiad.

On Thursday 27 October 1955, she received the bronze medal of the Belgian mérite sportif (sports merit).

Personal life 
Van Dievoet was born in Brussels to architect Henri van Dievoet and Eugenie Masson. She married Willy Dessecker in Uccle on 23 August 1937. They did not have children.

See also 

Swimming at the 1920 Summer Olympics – Women's 100 metre freestyle

Bibliography

 Théo Mathy, Dictionnaire des sports et des sportifs belges, Brussels, éditions Paul Legrain, 1982.

References

External links

Ful Olympians, Natation, Anvers, 1920, Germaine van Dievoet, site of Herman De Wael
Biography of Germaine van Dievoet
History of the Olympics of Antwerp. Nager en Belgique.
Biography of Germaine van Dievoet
The history of the family of Germaine van Dievoet
Her profile on the olympic.org website

Olympic swimmers of Belgium
Swimmers at the 1920 Summer Olympics
Sportspeople from Brussels
1899 births
1990 deaths
Women's World Games medalists
Germaine